Muhammad Hargianto (born 24 July 1996) is an Indonesian professional footballer who plays as a midfielder for Liga 1 club Bhayangkara. He is also a Second Police Brigadier in the Indonesian National Police.

Club career

Persebaya ISL (Bhayangkara)
On November 11, 2014, he signed a four-year contract with Persebaya ISL (Bhayangkara). He made his debut on 8 April 2015 as starting line-up, which ended 1–1 against Pusamania Borneo at Gelora Bung Tomo Stadium.

Persija Jakarta (loan)
In 2017, Hargianto joined Liga 1 club Persija Jakarta on loan from Bhayangkara. He made his league debut on 30 April 2017 in a match against PSM Makassar at the Andi Mattalatta Stadium, Makassar.

International career 
In August 2011, Hargianto was called up to the Indonesia U16 for 2012 AFC U-16 Championship qualification in Thailand. On 12 September 2011, He debuted in a youth national team when he coming as a starting in a 4–1 win against Myanmar U16 in the 2012 AFC U-16 Championship qualification. He also scored his first goal in 8th minute. Hargianto made his international debut for senior team on 21 March 2017, against Myanmar.

Career statistics

Club

International

International under-23 goals

Honours

International
Indonesia U-19
 AFF U-19 Youth Championship: 2013
Indonesia U-23
 Southeast Asian Games  Bronze medal: 2017
Indonesia
 Aceh World Solidarity Cup runner-up: 2017

References

External links 
 
 

1996 births
Living people
Betawi people
Indonesian footballers
Sportspeople from Jakarta
Persebaya Surabaya players
Bhayangkara F.C. players
Persija Jakarta players
Liga 1 (Indonesia) players
Indonesia youth international footballers
Indonesia international footballers
Association football midfielders
Southeast Asian Games bronze medalists for Indonesia
Southeast Asian Games medalists in football
Footballers at the 2018 Asian Games
Competitors at the 2017 Southeast Asian Games
Asian Games competitors for Indonesia